The 2007 IAAF World Cross Country Championships took place on March 24, 2007.  The races were held at the Mombasa Golf Course in Mombasa, Kenya. Four races took place, one for men, women, junior men and junior women respectively. All races encompassed both individual and team competition. The short race for men and women that was run between 1998 and 2006 was scrapped and the World Cross Country Championships went back to one-day format.  Reports of the event were given in the Herald, and for the IAAF.

Preparations 
When Athletics Kenya (AK, the national governing body of Athletics) applied for the event, it used the slogan "Cross Country Comes Home", referring to Kenyan and East African traditional dominance at the event. Nevertheless, no formidable Kenyan runners are known to come from Kenyan Coast Province. Instead, successful Kenyan runners typically represent Kalenjin tribes who reside in The Rift Valley Kenya, approximately 700-800 kilometres from Mombasa. AK chose Mombasa as a venue due to better infrastructure (such as hotels) compared to other cities. The 2007 World Cross Country Championships is one of the biggest international athletics event held in Kenya since the 1987 All-Africa Games, held 20 years ago in Nairobi. Another event held in Kenya was the 2003 Cricket World Cup.

Other applicants for the event were Miami in the United States and Madrid in Spain, both withdrew their candidature before final vote. The World Cross Country Championships have been held in Africa three times before. In 1975 and 1998 it was held in Morocco, the 1996 event took place in South Africa.

There was also an IAAF Council meeting held in Mombasa, at which the host cities for 2011 and 2013 IAAF World Championships in Athletics were selected.

Track and conditions 
Mombasa, the host, is the second largest city in Kenya, a major port town and tourist center. The event was held at Mombasa Golf Club, located in Mombasa Island, just east of the Kilindini Harbour. The track was curvy but relatively flat. The underlying ground was mostly grass.

The weather was sunny, hot and humid, typical of Mombasa, resulting in exhausting conditions. This kind of weather may affect competitors who hail from distant latitudes, but also Kenyan and Ethiopian runners, who often come from cooler highland areas. One victim was Pauline Korikwiang, Kenyan runner who was attempting to defend her junior women's title but fainted one kilometer before the finishing line.

Medallists

Race results

Senior men's race (12 km)
Kenenisa Bekele of Ethiopia, who has won five consecutive long and short course races,  promised to quit cross country running after the 2006 World Championships. However, he changed his mind and competed in Mombasa after all. A pre-race favourite, Bekele did not finish the race and thus failed to win historical sixth consecutive title.

Zersenay Tadese won the event and became the first cross-country world champion for Eritrea. Tadese is also the 2006 IAAF World Road Running Championships men's gold medalist.

Complete results for senior men and for senior men's teams were published.

Note: Athletes in parentheses did not score for the team result.

Junior men's race (8 km)
Complete results for junior men and for junior men's teams were published.

Note: Athletes in parentheses did not score for the team result.

Senior women's race (8 km)
Complete results for senior women and for senior women's teams were published.

Note: Athletes in parentheses did not score for the team result.

Junior women's race (6 km)
Complete results for junior women and for junior women's teams were published.

Note: Athletes in parentheses did not score for the team result.

Medal table (unofficial)

Note: Totals include both individual and team medals, with medals in the team competition counting as one medal.

Participation
According to an unofficial count, 470 athletes from 63 countries participated.  This is in agreement with the official numbers as published.  The

 (7)
 (3)
 (18)
 (1)
 (1)
 (5)
 (9)
 (12)
 (1)
 (11)
 (4)
 (4)
 (1)
 (1)
 (1)
 (2)
 (1)
 (23)
 (27)
 (11)
 (1)
 (5)
 (2)
 (1)
 (1)
 (9)
 (26)
 (27)
 (2)
 (1)
 (1)
 (2)
 (2)
 (27)
 (1)
 (5)
 (1)
 (4)
 (2)
 (13)
 (10)
 (1)
 (7)
 (12)
 (1)
 (2)
 (16)
 (19)
 (9)
 (2)
 (1)
 (1)
 (2)
 (24)
 (2)
 (26)
 (1)
 (25)
 (16)
 (1)
 (4)
 (6)
 (6)

See also
 2007 IAAF World Cross Country Championships – Senior men's race
 2007 IAAF World Cross Country Championships – Junior men's race
 2007 IAAF World Cross Country Championships – Senior women's race
 2007 IAAF World Cross Country Championships – Junior women's race
 2007 in athletics (track and field)

References

External links 
Official website   
IAAF Site
Special Coverage by Daily Nation (archived)

`

 
World Athletics Cross Country Championships
Iaaf World Cross Country Championships, 2007
Sport in Mombasa
Iaaf World Cross Country Championships, 2007
International athletics competitions hosted by Kenya
Cross country running in Kenya